The Soviet Union women's national field hockey team represented the Soviet Union in women's international field hockey and was controlled by the Federation of bandy and field hockey USSR, the governing body for field hockey in the Soviet Union.

Tournament record

Summer Olympics
1980 –

World Cup
1981 – 
1983 – 10th place
1986 – 8th place

European Championship
1984 – 
1987 – 
1991 –

Friendship Games
1984 –

Past squads

1980 Olympic Games

Valentina Zazdravnykh
Tatyana Shvyganova
Galina Vyuzhanina
Tatyana Yembakhtova
Alina Kham
Natella Krasnikova
Nadezhda Ovechkina
Nelli Gorbyatkova
Yelena Guryeva
Galina Inzhuvatova
Nadezhda Filippova
Lyudmila Frolova
Lidiya Glubokova
Leyla Akhmerova
Natalia Buzunova
Natalia Bykova

See also
Russia women's national field hockey team
Soviet Union men's national field hockey team

External links
Soviet Union field hockey team at 1980 Olympics at sports-references

National team
Former national field hockey teams
Field hockey
European women's national field hockey teams